Omori is a 2020 role-playing video game developed and published by indie studio Omocat. The player controls a  teenage boy named Sunny and his dream world alter-ego Omori. The player explores both the real world and Sunny's surreal dream world as Omori, either overcoming or suppressing his fears and forgotten secrets. How Sunny and Omori interact depends on choices made by the player, resulting in one of several endings. The game's turn-based battle system includes unconventional status effects based on characters' emotions. Prominently portraying concepts such as anxiety, depression, psychological trauma, and suicide, the game features strong psychological horror elements.

Omori is based on the director's webcomic series of the same name. After a successful Kickstarter campaign, the game was delayed numerous times and experienced several development difficulties. It was eventually released for macOS and Windows in December 2020, six years after its initial funding. It would also see a release on Nintendo Switch, Xbox One, Xbox Series X/S and PlayStation 4 with added content in June 2022. Critics praised the game's art direction, narrative elements, and depiction of anxiety and depression. Omori was favorably compared to games such as EarthBound and Yume Nikki, and went on to be nominated for several awards, winning DreamHack's "Daringly Dramatic" category in 2021. The game has sold over 1 million copies as of December 2022.

Gameplay

Omoris gameplay is inspired by traditional Japanese role-playing games. The gameplay is split between two settings, Headspace and Faraway Town. In Headspace, the player controls a party of four characters: Omori, Aubrey, Kel, and Hero. In Faraway, the player begins with only Sunny, and slowly gains party members as he reconnects with his friends. Each party member possesses their own unique skills for use both in battle and in overworld traversal.

The overworld portion is played from a top-down perspective. The game features side quests and puzzles for the player to solve, bestowing them with various rewards and skills upon completion. In Headspace, many beneficial weapons and items can be obtained, with some being purchasable using Headspace's currency, Clams. In Faraway, the currency is dollars, and most found or purchasable items have little practical use outside of progressing the story.

Battles are played out in a turn-based format in which each party member performs a move. After attacking, party members can work together to perform "follow up" attacks (Given they have available energy.) Follow ups use "Energy," a collective resource which starts at 3 at the start of each battle, and is gained when a party member takes damage, up to a maximum of 10. Characters and enemies have Heart, which functions as health points; if damage is taken, it decreases, and if it reaches zero, the character is defeated and turns into toast. The Juice meter is used to perform skills, special abilities which aid in battle (I.e pass to Omori). Outside of battle, the party can heal and save by encountering a picnic blanket, associated with Omori's older sister Mari. The player can also resurrect "Toast" characters by using either "Life jam" (A food which can be purchased using clams) or homemade jam (One of Hero's abilities which can be unlocked via levelling up).

Unlike most role-playing games, status effects are based on a three-pointed emotion system. A party member or opponent's emotion can change throughout the course of a battle, usually due to moves by another party member or enemy. Neutral is the baseline and has no effects; Angry increases attack but lowers defense; Sad increases defense but lowers speed, as well as converting a portion of damage to Heart into damage to Juice; and Happy increases luck and speed but lowers accuracy. Emotions are either strong or weak against each other – Happy beats Angry, Angry beats Sad, and Sad beats Happy. Additionally, higher-intensity variants of each emotion also exist.

Plot
The titular main character, Omori, awakens in "White Space", a barren void he has lived in "for as long as [he] can remember". He enters a door to the vibrant world of "Headspace", where he meets his friends, Aubrey, Kel, Hero, and Basil, and his older sister Mari. They peruse Basil's photo album, containing pictures of their shared memories, and decide to visit his house. Once they arrive, Kel and Aubrey scuffle, damaging the album. Upon seeing an unfamiliar photo fall from it, Basil panics and Omori is abruptly teleported back to White Space. He stabs himself with his knife, revealing the previous events to be the dreams of a teenage boy, Sunny, as he wakes up in the middle of the night.

The player discovers that Sunny and his mother are moving. He goes downstairs for a midnight snack but is confronted by a nightmarish hallucination. He dispels the illusion by taking deep breaths and returns to bed. Awakening once again in White Space, Omori reunites with Aubrey, Kel, and Hero. They discover that Basil has gone missing and set out to rescue him. The four explore the various regions of Headspace in search of Basil, with Mari assisting along the way. The group is continuously diverted from their search by various situations, leading their memory of Basil to gradually fade away. Eventually, they return to Basil's now-dilapidated house, where Omori is transported to the more disturbing "Black Space". Basil appears in different areas, repeatedly attempting to talk to him about something before dying gruesomely each time. In the final room, Omori kills Basil and places himself atop a throne of massive, red hands.

Meanwhile, in the real world, it is revealed that Mari committed suicide four years ago, which led to the friend group diverging. Although Kel and Hero managed to recover to varying degrees, Sunny became an estranged shut-in, Aubrey a delinquent, and Basil an anxious recluse. Kel knocks on Sunny's door in an attempt to reconnect one last time. The player can either ignore Kel or answer the door: if they choose the former, Sunny stays inside for the remaining three days, immersing himself in housework and his dreams.

If the latter option is chosen, Sunny and Kel venture outside to find Aubrey and her new friends bullying Basil. The two discover that she has stolen Basil's real-life photo album, ostensibly to stop him from vandalizing it. After confronting Aubrey, they return the album to Basil, though some photos are missing. As he believes Sunny needs it more, Basil lends the album to him. While eating dinner together, Basil becomes mortified as he learns of Sunny's impending departure and runs to the bathroom. Sunny finds him in a hallucinatory panic attack but leaves him alone. The next day, Kel and Sunny encounter Aubrey and her gang surrounding Basil at their old hangout spot. After they confront her, Aubrey angrily pushes Basil into a lake. Sunny dives in to rescue him, but both boys are saved from drowning by the arrival of Hero.

On the last day before Sunny's departure, the others reconcile with Aubrey, discovering she had kept the photos containing Mari from the album. Coming to terms with Mari's death, Sunny's friends decide to spend their final night together at Basil's house, despite him refusing to leave his room. In his sleep, Sunny confronts the truth about Mari's death: in an argument before their recital, he accidentally pushed Mari down their staircase, causing her to die. In denial that Sunny did it, Basil helped frame her death as suicide by hanging her corpse. As they finished, they glanced at Mari's body and saw an open eye staring back at them, shaping their subsequent hallucinations. While Basil was consumed by guilt and self-loathing, Sunny's suicidal depression led him to create Headspace and his dream persona Omori to repress his trauma. To hide the truth, Omori reset Headspace every time memories of the incident resurfaced. Sunny then wakes up in the middle of the night, leaving the player with the choice of either confronting Basil or falling back asleep.

Endings
If the player chooses to confront Basil, Sunny enters his room and is cordially greeted. However, Basil quickly loses his temper over Sunny's absence after Mari's death, and the two boys enter a delusional state and start fighting. After Basil stabs Sunny's right eye with his garden shears, both of them pass out. While unconscious, Sunny remembers his childhood memories with his friends and Mari, giving him the strength to face Omori. Refusing to die, Omori defeats Sunny, causing the player to receive a game over screen.

 If the player opts to continue, Sunny gets up and performs the recital with Mari. Omori then disappears and a hospitalized Sunny wakes up in the real world. He encounters his friends inside Basil's room, and it is implied that Sunny confesses the truth about Mari's death. Additionally, if the player watered Basil's garden daily in Headspace, an after-credits scene will depict Basil waking up to the sight of Sunny in the hospital. The two smile at each other and their hallucinations disappear.
 Should the player choose not to continue, Sunny disappears rather than Omori. After waking up, Sunny jumps off the hospital's balcony, plummeting to his presumed death.

Alternatively, if the player ignores Basil on the final day, Sunny and his friends will wake up to discover that he has committed suicide. Depending on the player's choice, Sunny can then either kill himself with his knife or move away with his guilt still unabated. This ending also occurs if the player has chosen to remain inside and avoid Kel.

Development and release
Omori was developed over the course of six and a half years, directed by pseudonymous artist Omocat. Initially planned as a graphic novel, they switched its medium to a video game to enable the audience to make choices in the story. For the game engine, they chose RPG Maker, as they deemed it important to support an accessible platform and community.

A Kickstarter campaign was launched in 2014, and was successfully funded within one day, with an initial projected release date of May 2015. A Nintendo 3DS port was promised as a stretch goal, but ultimately never came to fruition due to the discontinuation of the console. Backers were instead offered a Nintendo Switch port. To aid the game's creation, Omocat hired several additional team members, including an RPG Maker expert, but still had a goal of keeping the team size small. Initially, they enlisted their musician friends Space Boyfriend and Slime Girls to help with the soundtrack; after being inspired by Bo En's "My Time" and coming up with the idea of hidden music tracks, they contacted him as well.

As development continued, the team had to change their version of the RPG Maker engine, using this opportunity to refine the game's visual style, story, and gameplay. After crowdfunding money was exhausted, they relied on merchandise sales to continue development. The game would be delayed into 2019 and early 2020, but would again miss both targets.

Later in 2020, Omori received its final release date of December 25, when it was released on macOS and Windows via Steam. Initially available only in English, the Japanese localization was released on December 16, 2021. Following this, the support for Simplified Chinese and Korean languages was added on March 18, 2022.

The Nintendo Switch, PlayStation 4, and Xbox One versions of Omori were first announced during Playism's Tokyo Game Show 2019 presentation on September 11. Playism also announced it would be working on a Japanese release of the game, which was initially planned for 2020, but later delayed. During an Indie World presentation in December 2021, it was announced that a Nintendo Switch version would release in Q2 2022. The Nintendo Switch, Xbox One and Series X/S ports, as well as the new port for Windows 10, were eventually released digitally on June 17, 2022. After a slight delay, the PlayStation 4 port followed on June 24, 2022. These versions were developed by MP2 Games, and feature additional content not found in the original Steam release. The physical edition by Fangamer for Nintendo Switch and PlayStation 4 was initially planned to launch alongside the digital release, but did not launch until early July.

Reception

PC Gamer reviewer Rachel Watts praised both Omoris combat and gameplay, saying the game had "all the makings of being a modern cult classic". Patrick Hancock of Destructoid stated that he didn't "know the last game that really hit me so emotionally like [it] did", but criticized many gameplay elements, stating that they could ruin the experience for some players.

Multiple publications positively reviewed the game's depiction of anxiety and depression, with Rock Paper Shotgun reviewer Kat Bailey comparing it to her real-life experiences. According to her, the game managed to take overused themes regarding the subject and create a "memorable darkness". Watts stated that the game "captures this sentiment [of overcoming anxiety] masterfully", but criticized some parts of the game for being too dark.

A majority of reviewers praised the game's writing and tone, comparing it to games such as EarthBound, Undertale, and Yume Nikki. Writing for Wired magazine, reviewer Julie Fukunaga commended the depth and psychological themes of the narrative, stating that "it is in this medium that Omori thrives". Hancock praised the "juxtaposition" of serious and discomfiting themes with whimsical moments, stating he sometimes thought of the game's jokes "on a weekly basis".

Reviewers' opinion of the game's combat varied. Hancock criticized the lack of strategical depth, stating that he "found a strategy that worked and basically just repeated it ad nauseam", and claiming that the combat was "hardly necessary". Opposingly, Bailey praised the game's "well-executed" combat and "difficult" bosses, stating that they helped break up some of the dungeons. In her review, Rachel Watts complimented the way the game's abilities made the party feel like a cohesive unit.

The art direction also received positive reactions. Watts praised the art direction of the monsters, stating the mix of different art styles "really heightens the horror". The "anime-style cut-ins" were praised by Bailey, who called them "surprisingly well-animated". Despite his criticism of the game's battles, Hancock stated he often anticipated them due to the art style, calling it "nothing short of phenomenal".

Awards
Omori received two Honorable Mentions at the 2021 Independent Games Festival. It was also nominated for three categories in DreamHack's 2021 "Dreamies" awards, winning the "Daringly Dramatic" prize.

Sales
In Japan, the Nintendo Switch version of Omori sold 2,903 physical copies within its first week of release, making it the nineteenth bestselling retail game of the week in the country. On December 31, 2022, the game's official Twitter account announced that Omori had sold 1 million copies.

Notes

References

External links
 
 Fukunaga, J, 2021, Wired, viewed on 27th Feb, https://www.wired.com/story/omori-rpg-review/
Farah, J, 2021, Merry Go Round Magazine, viewed on 27th Feb, https://merrygoroundmagazine.com/omori-embodies-the-quiet-tragedy-of-escapism/
NYGCC, 2021, New York Game Critics Circle, viewed on 27th Feb, https://nygamecritics.com/2021/03/09/the-insight-omori-is-an-engaging-artistic-look-into-a-mind-riddled-with-guilty-and-dark-feelings/
Johri, S, 2022, The Michigan Daily, viewed on 27th Feb, https://www.michigandaily.com/arts/b-side/empathy-for-the-emotionless-understanding-omor/
Hassan, M, 2022, DuelShockers, viewed on 27th Feb, https://www.dualshockers.com/omori-is-a-beautiful-departure-from-jrpg-norms/

2020 video games
2020s horror video games
Adventure games
Cancelled Nintendo 3DS games
Crowdfunded video games
Indie video games
Kickstarter-funded video games
MacOS games
Nintendo Switch games
PlayStation 4 games
Psychological horror games
Role-playing video games
RPG Maker games
Single-player video games
Surrealist video games
Video games about dreams
Video games about mental health
Video games about suicide
Video games developed in the United States
Video games scored by Calum Bowen
Video games with alternate endings
Windows games
Xbox Cloud Gaming games
Xbox One games
Xbox Series X and Series S games